Kamaiyah Jamesha Johnson (born March 13, 1992) is an American rapper and singer from Oakland, California. Her debut mixtape, A Good Night in the Ghetto, was released in 2016 to critical acclaim. In 2017, Kamaiyah was named as one of the ten of XXLs 2017 Freshman Class. She released her second mixtape, Before I Wake, in 2017. In 2020, she launched her own label, GRND.WRK, releasing her third mixtape, Got It Made, through the label.

Career
Kamaiyah Johnson was born in Oakland, California, but raised in Sacramento. She is inspired by her favorite childhood 1990s artists such as TLC, Missy Elliott, and Aaliyah. Her debut single "How Does It Feel" premiered late in 2015 and was ranked one of the year's best songs by Pitchfork and NPR.

She released her debut mixtape, A Good Night in the Ghetto, in March 2016 to critical acclaim. Complex placed it at number 21 on the "50 Best Albums of 2016" list. Pitchfork placed it at number 47 on the "50 Best Albums of 2016" list. Rolling Stone placed it at number 17 on the "40 Best Rap Albums of 2016" list. The Guardian named it one of the 15 best mixtapes of 2016. Music videos were created for "Out the Bottle", "How Does It Feel", "For My Dawg", "F*ck It Up", "Mo Money Mo Problems", "I'm On", and "Freaky Freaks".

After releasing her debut mixtape, Kamaiyah performed at South by Southwest that month in Austin, Texas. That year she was also featured, along with Drake, on YG's "Why You Always Hatin?", a single from his 2016 Still Brazy. Later that year, Kamaiyah performed as an opener for YG on his Fuck Donald Trump Tour. Kamaiyah signed to Interscope Records in 2016.

On June 13, 2017, Kamaiyah was named as one of the ten of XXL's "2017 Freshman Class" along with A Boogie wit da Hoodie, PnB Rock, Playboi Carti, Ugly God, Kyle, Aminé, MadeinTYO, Kap G, and XXXTentacion. Kamaiyah announced a mixtape, Don't Ever Get it Twisted, which was delayed and eventually shelved, due to sample clearance issues and problems with her major label contract. She instead self-released a second mixtape, Before I Wake, in 2017.

Kamaiyah appeared in a Sprite commercial alongside LeBron James, in early 2018. Kamaiyah left Interscope Records and 4Hunnid Records after her project Something To Ride To, was delayed multiple times. Kamaiyah launched her own label GRND.WRK and released her third mixtape, Got it Made, in 2020. The project was preceded by the single "1-800-IM-HORNY".

On September 18, 2020, Kamaiyah released Oakland Nights, a collaborative EP with fellow Bay Area artist, Capolow. The 10-track EP marks Kamaiyah's second project released under her label, GRND.WRK.

In March 2022 a music documentary about the Hyphy movement We Were Hyphy, was released. It featured Kamaiyah and other musicians that were inspired by Hyphy including G-Eazy, and P-Lo.

Discography

EPs

Mixtapes

Singles

As lead artist

As featured artist

Guest appearances

References

External links
 
 
 

1992 births
Living people
American women rappers
African-American women rappers
People from Oakland, California
Rappers from the San Francisco Bay Area
21st-century American rappers
21st-century American women musicians
21st-century women rappers
21st-century African-American women
21st-century African-American musicians